Nursing research is research that provides evidence used to support nursing practices. Nursing, as an evidence-based area of practice, has been developing since the time of Florence Nightingale to the present day, where many nurses now work as researchers based in universities as well as in the health care setting.

Nurse education places focus upon the use of evidence from research in order to rationalise nursing interventions. In England and Wales, courts may determine if a nurse acted reasonably based upon whether their intervention was supported by research.

Nursing research falls largely into two areas:

 Quantitative research is based in the paradigm of logical positivism and is focused upon outcomes for clients that are measurable, generally using statistics. The dominant research method is the randomised controlled trial.
 Qualitative research is based in the paradigm of phenomenology, grounded theory, ethnography and others, and examines the experience of those receiving or delivering the nursing care, focusing, in particular, on the meaning that it holds for the individual. The research methods most commonly used are interviews, case studies, focus groups and ethnography

Recently in the UK, action research has become increasingly popular in nursing.

Evidence-based quality improvement practices
In 2008, the Agency for Healthcare Research and Quality AHRQ created the AHRQ Health Care Innovations Exchange to document and share health care quality improvement programs, including hundreds of profiles featuring nursing innovations. Each of the nursing profiles contained in this collection contains an evidence rating that assesses how strong the relationship is between the innovative practice and the results described in the profile.

See also

 AHRQ Health Care Innovations Exchange
 Evidence-based medicine
 Nursing journal
 Nursing theory

References

External links

 
Health research